Philip Edward Weir (1901 – 1963) was a Scottish footballer who played mainly as an outside right. His only senior club was East Fife, where he spent 13 seasons and is the record scorer with 228 goals despite playing on the wing – he was initially signed as a centre forward, but was not particularly effective in that role and moved out to allow others, including Arthur McGachie, to act as the focal point of attack.

The vast majority of Weir's goals in the Scottish Football League were scored in its second tier, although in his single season in the top division, 1930–31, he found the net 10 times (McGachie also contributed 14, but the Methil men still finished bottom of the table). This league total is recorded as 215 in some sources, or 218 in others. Weir contributed four goals in seven matches during East Fife's unexpected run to the 1927 Scottish Cup Final as a lower-tier side, where they lost 3–1 to Celtic.

See also
List of footballers in Scotland by number of league goals (200+)

References

1901 births
1963 deaths
Footballers from Edinburgh
Association football outside forwards
Scottish footballers
East Fife F.C. players
Scottish Junior Football Association players
Scottish Football League players